Painting Life is a 2018 Indian English film written and directed by Bijukumar Damodaran (commonly known as Dr. Biju). The film was jointly produced by Silicon Media and BlueOcean Pictures and depicts the experience of a film crew who get stranded in a remote Himalayan village.

Plot
The crew, led by a hit Bollywood filmmaker, arrives in the Himalayas to shoot a song and dance sequence for their upcoming blockbuster. Soon, they find themselves cut off from the outside world after torrential downpours and landslides. They are trapped with no basic amenities or means of communication and are at the mercy of the forces of nature.

The team, having been accustomed only to the breakneck pace and luxury of urban life, struggles to cope with the total isolation and the rough conditions. They are forced to interface closely with nature and the local folk and experience life at a much gentler pace. They also get exposed to the challenges faced by the local people.

For the director, who has been highly successful commercially, cinema is mainly an entertainment business with no connect to the real world or social issues. He saw the valley as merely a picturesque locale for his shoot. Through a series of intense and unforgettable experiences, he begins to see the reality beyond. His eyes open to the travails of the breathtakingly beautiful land and its beleaguered residents. How those eventful days under siege, affect the thoughts and priorities of the filmmaker, both on the personal and filmmaking fronts, forms the central theme of the film.

Cast
 Prakash Bare as Filmmaker
 Geetanjali Thapa as Lady in the guest house
 Shankar Ramakrishnan as Nassar
 Ritabhari Chakraborty as Actress
 Meera Vasudev as Wife (Guest appearance)
 Ravi Singh as Cinematographer
 Purav Goswami as Associate Director
 Krishnan Balakrishnan as Asst Director
 Melwyn Williams as Production Controller
 Noksha Saham as Hunter
 Phuntsok Ladakhi as Monk
 Tensing Lepcha as Hotel boy
 Kinsong Bhutia as Guesthouse manager
 Govardhan BK as Hotel boy
 Yangcho Bhutia as Girl from the village
 Arjun Subba as Boy from the village

Crew
Painting Life is the first English feature film directed by Dr. Biju, whose earlier eight films have won national film awards.
 
M. J. Radhakrishnan, a 7-time winner of Kerala State Film Awards for Best Cinematography, is behind the camera.

Singaporean composer Mark Chan is composed the background score of the film. The sound design, recording and mixing are performed by Jayadevan Chakkadath and Pramod Thomas. The film is co-produced by Silicon Media.

Production

Casting
Painting Life is a pan Indian project with a cast and crew from 10 different Indian states. The cast of the film includes Prakash Bare (Bangalore), Geetanjali Thapa (Mumbai), Ritabhari Chakraborty (Kolkata), Shankar Ramakrishnan (Kerala), Ravi Singh (Mumbai), Purav Goswami (Assam), Meera Vasudevan(Mumbai), Phuntsok Ladakhi (Jammu), Noksha Saham (Arunachal), Kinzong Bhutia (Sikkim), Master Govardhan(Kerala), Tensing Lepcha (Sikkim), Melwyn Williams (Delhi), Krishnan Balakrishnan (Kerala), Yancho Bhutia (Sikkim) and Arjun (Sikkim).

Filming
The film is shot entirely in Sikkim, an Indian state that borders China. The movie also talks about the dam construction which has impacted the ecology of this area. A number of NGOs and activists from the state, who continue to work against projects that threaten the ecosystem of Sikkim, were associated with the movie both on and behind the camera.

Festival Selections and Awards
 Winner Best Screen Play award at Aurangabad International film festival 2019
 Winner Premios Da Critica (Critics award) at 39th Oporto International film festival, Portugal, 2019
 Winner best cinematography at Indian Film festival Cincinnati, Ohio 2019 September
 Montreal World Film Festival, August 2018 in World Greats
 Almaty Film festival, September 2018 in Main competition
 Hanoi International Film Festival, October 2018 in Panorama
 Jogja NETPAC Asian Film Festival, November 2018 in Asian Perspective
 All Lights International Film festival, Hyderabad, December 2018 in Main competition
 International Film festival of Kerala in December 2018 in the section Indian Cinema Now
 Dhaka International Film Festival in December 2018 in Asian Film Competition section
 13th Ethiopian International Film Festival in December 2018 in World Cinema section 
 16th Chennai International Film Festival in December 2018
 6th Aurangabad International Film Festival in January 2019 in the Competition section
 11th Jaipur International Film Festival in January 2019
 Fantasporto 2019: 39th Oporto International Film Festival, Portugal in February 2019 in two Competition sections Director's week and Oriental Express
 Buddhist International Film Festival, Dikshabhumi, Nagpur. January 2019
 South East Asia film exhibition, Kunming, Chna. June 10 to 14
 Asian Film Festival Barcelona, Spain. 31 October to 10 November
 In Competition, Indian film festival Cincinnati, Ohio September 2019
 Buddhist film festival New Delhi, October 2019.
 Buddhist film festival Patna, October 2019
Indian Monographic Film Week, Canary Island, Spain, June 2020

References

External links

English-language Indian films
2018 films
Films shot in Sikkim
Indian independent films
Films set in the Himalayas
2010s English-language films